Fairview Township is a township in Butler County, Kansas, USA.  As of the 2000 census, its population was 491.

Fairview Township was organized in 1873.

Geography

The stream of Rock Creek runs through this township.

Further reading

References

 USGS Geographic Names Information System (GNIS)

External links
 City-Data.com

Townships in Butler County, Kansas
Townships in Kansas